The Official Credit Institute (Spanish; Instituto de Crédito Oficial: ICO) is a Spanish lending institution. Its functions include funding investment projects and the assistance for the liquidity needs of Spanish companies. It also operates as State Financial Agency.

Previously under the jurisdiction of the Ministry of Economy and Finance, it became a State company in 1989.

Presidents 
The presidents of the ICO are listed as follows:
 Rafael Bermejo Blanco (1978–1982)
  (1982)
 Julián García Vargas (1982–1985)
  (1986–1995)
 Fernando Becker Zuazua (1996–1998)
 José Gasset Loring (1999–2000)
 Ramón Aguirre Rodríguez (2000–2003)
  (2004–2009)
 José María Ayala Vargas (2009–2011)
 Román Escolano Olivares (2012–2014)
  (2014–2015)
 Emma Navarro Aguilera (2015–2016)
 Pablo Zalba Bidegain (2016–2018)
 José Carlos García de Quevedo (since 2018)

References 
Citations

Bibliography
 
 
 
 

financial services companies of Spain
companies based in Madrid